Rubén Silvano Manso Olivar (born 16 December, 1966) is a Spanish economist, businessman and politician.

Olivar was an inspector for the Bank of Spain and served as the chairman of Banco Madrid before becoming a representative in the Congress of Deputies for the Vox party.

Biography
Olivar graduated with a doctorate in economics from the Complutense University of Madrid and worked as a financial regulator and then the CEO of several asset managing companies, including Banco Zaragozano and Eurobank del Mediterráneo. In 2015, he was appointed chairman of Banco Madrid.

He has also lectured in economics and business science at the University of Alcalá.

Olivar took leave of absence from his roles at Banco Madrid and the Bank of Spain in order to become the coordinator of Vox's economic program.

Political career
Olivar was elected to the Congress of Deputies during the November 2019 Spanish general election to represent the Málaga constituency for Vox.

He is Vox's media spokesman for economic issues. He argues in favor of greater deregulation of financial markets, the abolition of autonomous communities and the minimum wage, as well as the reduction of social security contributions.

References 

1966 births
Living people
Members of the 14th Congress of Deputies (Spain)
Vox (political party) politicians
Spanish economists